Steven Parker may refer to:

 Steven Parker (defensive back) (born 1995), American football player
 Steven Parker, military police officer whose actions were the subject of the U.S. Supreme Court case Saucier v. Katz
 Steven Parker, co-creator of the website Neowin
 Steven Christopher Parker (born 1989), actor
 Steven J. Parker (died 2009), Boston pediatrician and co-author of the 7th edition of The Common Sense Book of Baby and Child Care

See also
Stephen Parker (disambiguation)
Steve Parker (disambiguation)